Maharashtra Animal and Fishery Sciences University is an agriculture state university headquartered from Nagpur, Maharashtra, India. It was established under The Maharashtra Animal and Fishery Sciences University Act, 1998. It was officially established on 3 December 2000 by carving seven colleges out of the other four state agriculture universities in Maharashtra.

References

Fisheries and aquaculture research institutes in India
Veterinary schools in India
Fishing in India
Universities and colleges in Nagpur
Science and technology in Nagpur
Universities in Maharashtra
Educational institutions established in 2000
2000 establishments in Maharashtra
Animal research institutes